Urdaneta is one of the 18 municipalities (municipios) that makes up the Venezuelan state of Aragua and, according to the 2011 census by the National Institute of Statistics of Venezuela, the municipality has a population of 21,271. The town of Barbacoas is the shire town of the Urdaneta Municipality.

Name
The municipality is one of several in Venezuela named "Urdaneta Municipality" in honour of Venezuelan independence hero Rafael Urdaneta.

Demographics
The Urdaneta Municipality, according to a 2007 population estimate by the National Institute of Statistics of Venezuela, has a population of 21,270 (up from 19,339 in 2000). This amounts to 1.3% of the state's population.

Government
The mayor of the Urdaneta Municipality is Sotero González, re-elected on October 31, 2004, with 32% of the vote.  The municipality is divided into four parishes; Capital Urdaneta, Las Peñitas, San Francisco de Cara, and Taguay.

References

External links

urdaneta-aragua.gob.ve 

Municipalities of Aragua